Mastain William (Matt) Miles (June 14, 1850 – February 8, 1901) was an American politician in the state of Washington. He lived in Waverly, Iowa for 25 years and became postmaster in Waterville, Washington. He served in the Washington House of Representatives from 1895 to 1897.

References

1850 births
1901 deaths
Republican Party members of the Washington House of Representatives
People from Iowa
People from Waterville, Washington
People from Waverly, Iowa
19th-century American politicians